OrbusNeich is a global pioneer in the provision of life-changing vascular solutions and offers an extensive portfolio of products that set industry benchmarks in vascular intervention.

In 2013, OrbusNeich received CE mark for the world's first and only dual therapy stent, the COMBO Dual Therapy Stent. The COMBO Stent features active endothelial progenitor cell (EPC) capture technology, which promotes the accelerated natural healing of the vessel wall after the implantation of a stent. Several trials including a randomized study dedicated to patients with Acute Coronary Syndrome (ACS) and registries with a sizeable ACS patient subset demonstrated consistently low event rates and short DAPT option of 3 months, if needed.

History 
Neich Medical, with its headquarters in Hong Kong, China, established its manufacturing facilities in Shenzhen, China, in 2000 to begin the research and development of interventional medical devices, including balloon catheters. 

By 2001, the company had obtained license approval for the sale of its first balloon catheter product in China and the European Union markets. Other balloon catheters soon followed.

Neich Medical continued its international expansion in 2005 by acquiring its longstanding partner Orbus Medical Technologies Inc., a company with strong ties in the European medical community, whose main business was the research and development of interventional medical devices, pioneering the design of the dual helical coronary stent platform, thus forming OrbusNeich Medical.

Over the years, OrbusNeich has brought to market a range of innovative stent and balloon devices, including a series of angioplasty balloon catheters for the management of the most complex lesions, including chronic total occlusion, for both the treatment of coronary and peripheral vascular disease.

Products 
OrbusNeich offers an extensive portfolio for both coronary and peripheral vascular intervention.

CE-marked products:

Coronary Portfolio

Balloon Catheters

 Sapphire® 3
 Sapphire® II PRO 1.0-1.5mm
 Sapphire® II PRO 1.75-4.0mm
 Sapphire® NC 24
 Sapphire® II NC
 Scoreflex® NC
 Scoreflex®

Microcatheters

 Teleport®

Stents

 Azule®
 COMBO® Plus

Orbital Atherectomy

 Diamondback® 360 Orbital Atherectomy System (distributor in key territories; manufactured by Cardiovascular Systems, Inc.)

Peripheral Portfolio

Balloon Catheters

 JADE®
 Scoreflex® PTA (BTK, SFA, AVF)

Microcatheters

 Teleport®

Orbital Atherectomy

 Stealth® 360 Orbital Atherectomy System (distributor in key territories; manufactured by Cardiovascular Systems, Inc.)

FDA-approved products:

Coronary Portfolio

Balloon Catheters

 Sapphire® II PRO 1.0-1.5mm
 Sapphire® II PRO 1.75-4.0mm
 Sapphire® NC Plus (US only)

Microcatheters

 Teleport®

Peripheral Portfolio

Balloon Catheters

 JADE® OTW
 Sapphire® II PRO 1.0-1.5mm
 Sapphire® II PRO 1.75-4.0mm

Microcatheters

 Teleport®

Locations
OrbusNeich is represented throughout the world. The Corporate Headquarters are located in Hong Kong, and direct sales teams are operating from Hong Kong, Singapore, Malaysia, Japan, PRC, Germany, Switzerland, Spain and France. A distributor network is covering more than 60 countries across six continents. The company has a state-of-the art production and research & development facility in Shenzhen, China, an advanced research & development facility in Fort Lauderdale, Florida, USA and further production facilities in Hoevelaken, The Netherlands.

References

External links 
 OrbusNeich Website

Medical technology companies of China
Manufacturing companies of Hong Kong